Hazeley is a village in the Hart District in Hampshire, England. It is 2.5 miles (3 km) away from Hartley Wintney and comes under the parish of Mattingley.

References

Villages in Hampshire